Edwin Rogers Embree (1883–1950) was one of the former vice presidents of the Rockefeller Foundation, president of the Julius Rosenwald Foundation (also known as the Rosenwald Fund), a writer, and president of the Liberian Foundation.

Early life

Embree was born in Nebraska in 1883, the youngest of four children of Laura and William Norris Embree. His grandfather and grandmother were John Gregg Fee and Matilda Fee, Abolitionist leaders from Kentucky. Embree had a very close relationship with his grandfather, the founder and president of Berea College. His father was discharged from the Union Army, after he took a job as a telegrapher with the Union Pacific Railroad. His father died in 1891, so his mother took her four children and moved with her parents to Berea. Embree's grandfather John Fee formed Embree's values and character at an early age, so he followed his grandfather examples. Edwin went to school at Berea and Yale, became a lecturer, and had many other outstanding accomplishments throughout his life. He died in 1950.

Education
Embree attended Berea Academy when he was growing up. He later attended and graduated from Berea College, then enrolled in Yale where he graduated with an advance degree in philosophy. He later worked at Yale for 10 years in alumni affairs.

Accomplishments
In 1917, Embree joined the Rockefeller staff in New York as secretary (1917–1924), then as director of the Division of Studies (1925–1927), and later as one of three vice presidents (1927). He also traveled to Japan several times while working with Rockefeller. He became president of the Julius Rosenwald Foundation also known as the Rosenwald Fund for 20 years (1927–1948).  When the foundation closed, he became president of the Liberian Foundation. Embree also wrote a handful of books. Brown America "The Story of a New Race" 1931. "Indians of the Americas" 1939. American Negroes "A Handbook" 1942. “Brown Americans: The Story of a Tenth of the Nation” 1943. "13 Against the Odds" 1944.

References

 
 
 Rosenwald School Initiative
 The Rockefeller Archive Center – Papers of Individuals – Rockefeller Foundation

External links 
Edwin Rogers Embree papers (MS 198). Manuscripts and Archives, Yale University Library. 

1883 births
1950 deaths
People from Nebraska
American male non-fiction writers
Yale Graduate School of Arts and Sciences alumni